Taylorville is a former settlement in Marin County, California. Taylorville still appeared on maps as of 1914.

Taylorville had a post office, a tannery, a gun powder factory, a water-powered paper mill, then later a steam-driven mill. An orchard, cattle ranch and was serviced by train from 1875 until 1933.  Cap Taylor, on the same property had a hotel, a dance hall, two bowling alleys, boating on the creek, hunting and fishing. As many as 3000 people would visit on popular weekends.

The name honors Samuel P. Taylor, founder of the first paper mill on the West Coast.

References

Further reading

Former settlements in Marin County, California
Former populated places in California